Snow (stylized in all caps) is an image messaging and multimedia mobile application created by Camp Mobile, a subsidiary of South Korean internet search giant Naver Corporation. It features virtual stickers using augmented reality and photographic filters. Pictures and messages sent through  Snow are only accessible for a short time.

Background 
Snow was launched September 2015 by Camp Mobile. The company collaborated with different Korean artists such as BTS and Twice to launch selfie stickers.

In 2016, the app spun off into its own company, named as Snow Corp.

In 2018, Snow Corp raised $50M from SoftBank and Sequoia China. It is reported that it plans to use the investment to develop its augmented reality and facial recognition technologies.

Features 
Snow allows users to take pictures or videos (of a maximum duration of 5 minutes) and choose from 1,300 stickers and 50 filters. They can also send them as messages that destroy themselves in 48 hours. Videos could also be saved as GIF files. According to Business Insider, the app functions as a clone of Snapchat.

References

External links 
 Official website
 SNOW Corp. website

Naver Corporation
Instant messaging
Image-sharing websites
South Korean social networking websites
Android (operating system) software
IOS software